Head of the Class is an American sitcom developed by Amy Pocha and Seth Cohen that was released on the streaming service HBO Max on November 4, 2021. It is based on Rich Eustis and Michael Elias' series of the same name that ran from 1986 to 1991. In December 2021, the series was canceled after one season.

In December 2022, the series was removed from HBO Max. On January 31, 2023, it was announced that the series will be released on The Roku Channel and Tubi.

Cast and characters

Main
 Isabella Gomez as Alicia Gomez, a new young teacher of the honors debate class at Meadows Creek High School bearing a similar personality to Charlie Moore, a history teacher who taught honors class at Millard Fillmore High School on the original Head of the Class.
 Dior Goodjohn as Robyn Rook, captain of the debate team and secretly a gamer.
 Gavin Lewis as Luke Burrows, member of the debate team who is obsessed with business and politics.
 Adrian Matthew Escalona as Miles Alvarez, Luke's best friend and member of the debate team who likes to sing.
 Brandon Severs as Terrell Hayward, son of Darlene Merriman (Robin Givens) from the original run of Head of the Class, member of the debate team and a swimmer.
 Jolie Hoang-Rappaport as Makayla Washington, member of the debate team who is very interested in big social issues.
 Jorge Diaz as Elliot Escalante, an English teacher at Meadows Creek High School
 Katie Beth Hall as Sarah Maris, Principal Maris' daughter who is a student at Meadows Creek High School and a swimmer. She has a close friendship with Terrell. She is initially reluctant to join the debate class but eventually joins the team.

Recurring
 Christa Miller as Principal Maris, the principal at Meadows Creek High School and Sarah's mother

Special guest star
 Robin Givens as Darlene, Terrell's mother and the co-chair of the Parents Association at Meadows Creek High School. Much like her son, Darlene was an honors student herself, having been in the Individualized Honors Program at Millard Fillmore High School on the series' first 5 seasons.

Production

Development
On May 12, 2020, HBO Max gave a reboot pilot order and five additional scripts for Head of the Class. The pilot was written by Amy Pocha and Seth Cohen. On March 31, 2021, HBO Max gave the reboot a series order consisting ten episodes. The series is developed by Amy Pocha and Seth Cohen who are expected to executive produce alongside Jeff Ingold and Bill Lawrence. Phill Lewis directed the pilot. The series is based on Michael Elias and Rich Eustis' Head of the Class. Production companies involved with the series were slated to consist of Doozer Productions and Warner Bros. Television. The series was released on November 4, 2021, with all ten episodes. On December 17, 2021, HBO Max announced that they would not be moving forward with a second season.

Casting
In November 2020, Isabella Gomez and Jolie Hoang-Rappaport were cast in starring roles. On December 17, 2020, Gavin Lewis joined the main cast. In January 2021, Jorge Diaz, Dior Goodjohn, Brandon Severs, Adrian Matthew Escalona, and Katie Beth Hall were cast to star while Christa Miller was cast in a recurring role. On October 12, 2021, a first-look clip revealed Robin Givens reprises her role as Darlene Merriman in undisclosed capacity.

Filming
Production began in the summer of 2021 in Los Angeles.

Episodes

Reception

The review aggregator website Rotten Tomatoes reported a 67% approval rating with an average rating of 5.8/10, based on 9 critic reviews. Metacritic, which uses a weighted average, assigned a score of 63 out of 100 based on 5 critics, indicating "generally favorable reviews".

References

External links

2021 American television series debuts
2021 American television series endings
2020s American high school television series
2020s American teen sitcoms
2020s American workplace comedy television series
English-language television shows
HBO Max original programming
Television series reboots
Television series about educators
Television series about teenagers
Television series by Warner Bros. Television Studios
Television shows set in the San Francisco Bay Area